This article lists players who have captained the Limerick county hurling team in the Munster Senior Hurling Championship and the All-Ireland Senior Hurling Championship.

List of captains

Hurlers
+Captains
Limerick